Stefan Szelestowski (11 November 1900 – 7 October 1987) was a Polish long-distance runner and modern pentathlete. He competed in the 5000 metres and the 3000 metres team race at the 1924 Summer Olympics. Four years later, he competed in the modern pentathlon at the 1928 Summer Olympics.

References

External links
 

1900 births
1987 deaths
Polish male long-distance runners
Polish male modern pentathletes
Olympic athletes of Poland
Olympic modern pentathletes of Poland
Athletes (track and field) at the 1924 Summer Olympics
Modern pentathletes at the 1928 Summer Olympics
Athletes from Warsaw
People from Warsaw Governorate
20th-century Polish people